According to the "Hertfordshire Village Book", cricket matches have been played on Redbourn Common since 1666 AD, this being the earliest report of the game in the country. Redbourn Cricket Club, however, from the records available, was not established until 1823, when a committee was formed and minutes of their meetings kept.

Redbourn won the County Challenge Cup for 3 consecutive years (1888, 1889, and 1890) and were given the trophy in recognition of this achievement. This silver trophy is still the property of the club and has been passed on to each Club President over the years.

Present day

2008
2008 proved to be an outstanding year for the senior sides. For the first time in the Club's history, the 1st XI won a Herts League Title, capturing the Division 4 title. The Club also secured a league & cup double by winning the Herts Trophy Final.

The 2nd XI finished just outside the promotion slots in Division 7 and, but for a couple of matches lost to the weather, they may have been even closer. A number of them have made great contributions this season, especially towards the success of the 1st XI.

The 3rd XI, playing in only their second season, dominated Division 13 from the outset and won it comfortably. They surpassed the goals set by their captain and a big positive was the contribution made by the side's U14 players.

2009
Once again, 2009 saw Redbourn have success, with the 1st XI being promoted for a second successive year.

Recent League Performances - 1st XI

Cricket in Hertfordshire
English club cricket teams
1666 establishments in England
Redbourn